Kalash (also Romanized as Kalāsh; also known as Kalās, Keyālāsh, Kialāsh, and Kūlash) is a village in Chelleh Khaneh Rural District, Sufian District, Shabestar County, East Azerbaijan Province, Iran. At the 2006 census, its population was 343, in 82 families.

References 

Populated places in Shabestar County